John Brice may refer to:

John Brice Jr. (1705–1766), early American settler and Loyalist politician in colonial Maryland
John Brice III (1738–1820), American lawyer, businessman, and political leader from Maryland
John Brice (MP), British politician, Member of Parliament for Melcombe Regis (UK Parliament constituency)
John J. Brice (1842–1912), United States Navy officer, U.S. Commissioner of Fish and Fisheries (1896–1898)